Ren Xin (born 22 May 1989) is a Chinese football player.

Club career
Ren Xin started his professional football career at Shenzhen Ruby during the 2009 Chinese Super League season after graduating from the club's youth team and would make his debut in a league game against Guangzhou F.C. on March 28, 2009 in a 2–1 defeat. By the end of his debut season with the club he made nineteen league appearances and was on his way to establish himself as regular within the squad.

In season 2010 Ren Xin dropped in pecking order in the competition with newly joining players and seniors. After pre-season of 2011 Ren Xin didn't win a contract under new manager Philippe Troussier and left the club.
In January 2012 Ren Xin joined Shenzhen Fengpeng but only got back into competitive matches in later stage after struggling with injury for the most time of season.

On 24 February 2017, Ren transferred to League One side Zhejiang Yiteng.

Career statistics 
Statistics accurate as of match played 31 December 2020.

Honours

Club
Jiangxi Liansheng
 China League Two: 2014

References

External links
Player profile at titan24.com (Chinese)
 

1989 births
Living people
People from Jiujiang
Chinese footballers
Footballers from Jiangxi
Shenzhen F.C. players
FK Sūduva Marijampolė players
Jiangxi Beidamen F.C. players
Zhejiang Yiteng F.C. players
Chinese Super League players
China League One players
Association football defenders